For someone seated, the popliteal height is the distance from the underside of the foot to the underside of the thigh at the knees. It is sometimes called the "stool height". (The term "sitting height" is reserved for the height to the top of the head when seated.)

This height greatly varies between ethnic groups. For British people, the median popliteal height is 440 millimetres for men and 400 mm for women, while Japanese men have a popliteal height of 400 mm and women 360
 mm.

References 

Anthropometry